Gordi (trans. The Proud Ones) were a Yugoslav rock band formed in Belgrade in 1977.

The band was formed by guitarist and vocalist Zlatko Manojlović, former leader of the progressive rock band Dah. Initially the band's works were progressive/hard rock-oriented. However, with their fourth studio album, Pakleni trio (1981), the band turned towards heavy metal. The band released one more heavy metal album, Kraljica smrti (1982), disbanding two years after the release. After Gordi ended their activity, Manojlović started a successful career as a solo artist. In the post-Yugoslav countries Gordi are generally most remembered for their heavy metal works and their last two releases are often considered milestones on the Yugoslav heavy metal scene.

History

1977–1984
The band was formed in November 1977 by former Džentlmeni, Fleš and Dah member Zlatko Manojlović after his return from his mandatory stint in the Yugoslav People's Army. The band's first lineup consisted of Zlatko Manojlović (guitar, vocals), Zlatko's brother Goran Manojlović (a former Dah member, keyboards), Stevan "Steva" Milutinović (a former Dogovor iz 1804., Moira and Dah member, drums) and Dragan Janković (a former Buket Mojih Prijatelja member, bass guitar). After Zdenko Pomper (a former Dah member) replaced Janković on bass guitar, the band released its debut album Čovek (A Man) in 1978, through ZKP RTLJ. Album featured the song "Misli" ("Thoughts"), which was previously released as the B-side of the single "Žeđ" ("Thirst"), the last single released by Dah. The lyrics for the song "Odlazim u noć" ("I'm Leaving into the Night") were written by Predrag Vuković, percussionist of the band Igra Staklenih Perli.

Soon after the release of the debut album, Pomper was replaced by Slobodan Svrdlan, with whom Gordi released their second studio album, Gordi 2. The album was released in 1979 through PGP-RTB. While the band's first album was mainly progressive rock-oriented, Gordi 2 featured more hard rock elements. In 1980 Zlatko Manojlović released his first solo album Zlatko i njegove gitare (Zlatko and His Guitars), and in 1981 the band released their third studio album, Gordi 3, through PGP-RTB. The album featured a new drummer,  Čedomir Petrović "Čeda" (a former Bicikl and Siluete member). Although generally progressive/hard rock-oriented, Gordi 3 also featured some pop music elements. The closing track on the album, instrumental "Uspavanka" ("Lullaby"), was dedicated to Zlatko Manojlović's son Miloš. During the same year Gordi performed as the opening band on Ian Gillan Band concert in Belgrade Pionir Hall.

In 1981, Gordi became a power trio, after Goran Manojlović left the band. The band signed for Jugoton and released the album Pakleni trio (Hell Trio), which marked their shift towards heavy metal. In 1982, the band released their second heavy metal-oriented album, Kraljica smrti (Queen of Death), however, they failed to sustain their popularity and disbanded two years after the album release.

Post breakup
Manojlović dedicated himself to his solo career. Svrdlan became a member of the heavy metal band Ratnici, releasing two albums with them. In 1983, he played bass guitar on U Škripcu album O je!. In the early 1990s he moved to Los Angeles, where he became a member of the band Lost City, recording the album Watching You (1993) with them. In the late 1990s he was a member of the British band Michael Aston's Gene Loves Jezebel, appearing on their 1999 album Love Lies Bleeding. In 2005, he appeared as a guest on Generacija 5 album Energija (Energy), playing bass guitar on five tracks.

In 1994 the song "Put do pakla" ("Road to Hell") was released on Komuna compilation album Pakleni vozači: Jugoslovenski hard rock (Hell Riders: Yugoslav Hard Rock), which was a part of Komuna's YU retROCKspektiva (YU RetROCKspective) album series. In 2006 Rock Express Records reissued Pakleni trio, featuring four videos as bonus material. In 2007 the same record label rereleased Kraljica smrti, featuring three videos as bonus material.

Discography

Studio albums
Čovek (1978)
Gordi 2 (1979)
Gordi 3 (1979)
Pakleni trio (1981)
Kraljica smrti (1982)

Singles
"Duga noć" / "Idi sad" (1978)

References

External links
Gordi at Discogs
Gordi at Encyclopaedia Metallum

Serbian progressive rock groups
Serbian hard rock musical groups
Serbian heavy metal musical groups
Yugoslav progressive rock groups
Yugoslav hard rock musical groups
Yugoslav heavy metal musical groups
Musical groups from Belgrade
Musical groups established in 1977
Musical groups disestablished in 1984